The second election to the Ceredigion County Council was held on 6 May 1999. It was preceded by the 1995 election and followed by the 2004 election.

Overview
Once again, the Independents were the largest group with a number of councillors elected unopposed

Thirty members of the original Council elected in 1995 were again returned.

Fourteen candidates were returned unopposed. Thirteen were sitting Independent or Liberal Democrat councilors; the only exception being Cen Llwyd, who was returned for Plaid Cymru in Llandysiliogogo ward, replacing a retiring Independent.

Boundaries
There were no boundary changes.

Candidates
Most of the retiring members sought re-election.

Results

Aberaeron (one seat)

Aberporth (one seat)

Aberystwyth East (two seats)

Aberystwyth North (two seats)

Aberystwyth South (two seats)

Aberystwyth West (two seats)

Beulah (one seat)

Borth (one seat)

Capel Dewi (one seat)

Cardigan (three seats)
John Adams-Lewis was elected as an Independent in 1995.

Ceulanamaesmawr (one seat)

Ciliau Aeron (one seat)

Faenor (one seat)

Lampeter (two seats)

Llanarth (one seat)

Llanbadarn Fawr (two seats)
Plaid Cymru had won a seat following the death of a previous Independent councillor.

Llandyfriog (one seat)

Llandysiliogogo (one seat)

Llandysul Town (one seat)

Llanfarian (one seat)

Llanfihangel Ystrad (one seat)
Plaid Cymru had won the seat at a by-election

Llangeitho (one seat)

Llangybi (one seat)

Llanrhystud (one seat)

Llansantffraed (one seat)

Llanwenog (one seat)

Lledrod (one seat)

Melindwr (one seat)

New Quay (one seat)

Penbryn (one seat)

Penparc (one seat)

Tirymynach (one seat)

Trefeurig (one seat)

Tregaron (one seat)

Troedyraur (one seat)

Ystwyth (one seat)

By-elections 1999-2004

Aberystwyth East 2000
A by-election was held in the Aberystwyth East ward following the resignation of Plaid Cymru councillor Simon Thomas, who was elected MP for Ceredigion and Pembroke North at a by-election earlier that year.

Borth 2001
A by-election was held in the Borth ward on 29 March 2001 following the death of Tom Raw-Rees. The seat was held by an Independent candidate.

Aberporth 2001

Llanbadarn Fawr 2001
A by-election was held in the Llanbadarn Fawr ward following the resignation of Plaid Cymru councillor Gwydion Gruffudd.

Cardigan 2002
A by-election was held in the Cardigan ward following the resignation of Plaid Cymru councillor Trevor Griffiths.

References

1999
1999 Welsh local elections
20th century in Ceredigion